Phitosia is a genus of Greek plants in the tribe Cichorieae within the family Asteraceae.

The only known species is Phitosia crocifolia, found only in the Taigetos Range on the Peloponnese Peninsula in Greece. It is listed as an endangered species on the International Union for Conservation of Nature's Red List under the synonymous name Crepis crocifolia.

References 

Monotypic Asteraceae genera
Endemic flora of Greece
Cichorieae
Taxa named by Pierre Edmond Boissier
Taxa named by Theodor von Heldreich
Taxa named by Werner Greuter
Taxobox binomials not recognized by IUCN